"Good Vibrations" is a song by American group Marky Mark and the Funky Bunch featuring Loleatta Holloway. It was released in July 1991 as the lead single from their debut album, Music for the People (1991). The song became a number-one hit in the United States, Denmark, Sweden and Switzerland. It spent twenty weeks on the Billboard Hot 100, its last week rising 40 positions to number 27, but dropped out the following week.

Background
"Good Vibrations" was co-written by Amir Shakir (credited on the release as "Spice"), with his good friends Donnie and Mark Wahlberg. Amir also wrote and produced "Wildside" and three other songs for Mark Wahlberg's debut album, as well as four songs on Wahlberg's second LP. "Good Vibrations" features a sample of American singer Loleatta Holloway singing "Love Sensation", written by Dan Hartman, and Hartman was given co-writer credits on later releases of Wahlberg's song.

Critical reception
Bill Lamb from About.com said Mark Wahlberg had a history of scrapes with the law as a teenager, "but his ready-for-video buffed body and good looks, combined with energetic dance beats and Loleatta Holloway's diva-esque vocals, made for a smash pop hit." AllMusic editor Steve Huey noted that the rapper's "aggressively delivered raps were fairly simplistic, but not comical; one of the main hooks was a simple piano sample that ascended, descended, and reascended." He added that "Good Vibrations" "was easily the most infectious song Marky Mark ever recorded". J.D. Considine from The Baltimore Sun felt that when Mark rides the rhythm, "it's easy to forgive his derivative rhymes, particularly when the beat is as strong as it is on "Good Vibrations"." Billboard magazine named it one of the "pick tracks" from the Music for the People album, noting that it features "canny sampling", and adding that Marky Mark "enters Vanilla Ice territory with a lightweight pop/rap track." 

Dave Sholin from the Gavin Report wrote that "bustin' out of Boston", Donnie Wahlberg's younger brother "is kickin' it and makin' one serious debut! The Wahlberg Brothers wrote and produced this hot track—something they deserve to point to with pride. Credit Loleatta Holloway with takin' it up more than a few notches on a chorus nothing short of incredible." A reviewer from Music Week commented, "Sampling is also an art form dear to Marky Mark & the Funky Bunch. But, to their credit, their debut single acknowledges their debut to Loleatta Holloway's now-familiar "It's such a good vibration". This may not be a big hit, but with 20-year-old Marky's rhythmic rapping, good looks and bad-boy image, it's chartbound." Johnny Dee from Smash Hits said "it sounds uncannily like "Ride On Time" by Black Box with a couple of raps over the top. But! As Marky puts it, this is "designed to make your behind move" and it does."

Music video
A black and white music video was produced to promote the single. It featured Marky Mark working out and boxing barechested, and making out with a woman on a bed. Boxer Micky Ward is credited for helping with the boxing technique and training used for this video. Loleatta Holloway also made an appearance performing the chorus. Mark Wahlberg first met Micky Ward when he was 18 and later played him on the big screen in the 2010 film The Fighter. The music video was produced by David Horgan and directed by Scott Kalvert.

Impact and legacy
In 2017, BuzzFeed ranked "Good Vibrations" number 43 in their list of "The 101 Greatest Dance Songs of the '90s". 

In 2019, Billboard placed it at number 115 in their ranking of "Billboards Top Songs of the '90s".

In 2021, it was ranked number 35 by BuzzFeed in their list of "The 50 Best '90s Songs of Summer".-

Track listings
 7" single
 "Good Vibrations" — 4:29
 "So What Chu Sayin" — 4:41

 CD maxi
 "Good Vibrations" (club dub) — 5:22
 "Good Vibrations" — 4:29
 "Good Vibrations" (instrumental dub) — 5:02
 "So What Chu Sayin" — 4:41

Charts

Weekly charts

Year-end charts

Certifications

References

1991 debut singles
1991 songs
Marky Mark and the Funky Bunch songs
Loleatta Holloway songs
Interscope Records singles
Billboard Hot 100 number-one singles
Number-one singles in Denmark
Number-one singles in Sweden
Number-one singles in Switzerland
Songs written by Dan Hartman
Songs written by Mark Wahlberg
Black-and-white music videos